Diao Wenyuan is a former international table tennis player and coach from China. 

He won a silver medal at the 1973 World Table Tennis Championships in the Swaythling Cup (men's team event) with Li Ching-kuang, Liang Ko-liang, Hsi En-ting and Hsu Shao-Fa for China.  

He was the Chinese national singles and doubles champion in 1972.

See also
 List of table tennis players
 List of World Table Tennis Championships medalists

References

Chinese male table tennis players
Living people
1943 births
Table tennis players from Anhui
People from Mingguang
People from Wuhe County
World Table Tennis Championships medalists